Bryants Creek is a stream in Pike and Lincoln counties of eastern Missouri. It is a tributary of the Mississippi River.

Bryants Creek has the name of Rolla Bryant, the original owner the site.

See also
List of rivers of Missouri

References

Rivers of Lincoln County, Missouri
Rivers of Pike County, Missouri
Rivers of Missouri